John Leslie (born John Leslie Stott; 22 February 1965) is a Scottish former television and radio presenter. Debuting on the Music Box channel in 1987, he later presented BBC One's Blue Peter, and ITV's This Morning and the gameshow Wheel of Fortune. He was also the studio host for the first series of the UK version of Survivor.

Personal life
John Leslie Stott was born in Edinburgh, the brother of Grant Stott. He attended Liberton High School and James Gillespie's High School. He spent his early years in the church choir, studied music on leaving school, and worked as a DJ in Copenhagen. His first television work was on Yorkshire Television, when he hosted Music Box's all-night music show, Formula One which was the English language version of the German TV music show which was shown on Super Channel and in some ITV regions in 1987 and 1988 where he would link music performances from the German original from a UK studio, in 1989. Prior to his television career he worked as a DJ in nightclubs in Edinburgh and Newcastle, becoming resident DJ at the Blu Bambu club.

Leslie had a widely publicised relationship with nurse Abi Titmuss, who became a star in her own right when a video Leslie filmed of her having sex with another woman was leaked.

Football
Leslie is also known for his affinity for football. He played in goal for the Scottish team in the Celebrity World Cup Soccer Six tournament, which took place on 14 May 2006 at St Andrew's, the home of Birmingham City. He is a supporter of Hibernian.

Television

Blue Peter
On 20 April 1989, Leslie became Blue Peters first Scottish presenter, and also the tallest at 1.93 m (6' 4"). He was the second Blue Peter presenter to take part in the London Marathon, following Peter Duncan. He finished in four hours, thirty-six minutes.

On his last show he was set John's Final Challenge which involved abseiling down BBC Television Centre, completing a velcro and wheelbarrow obstacle course, then trampolining and conducting an orchestra in the studio. Leslie presented Blue Peter with Caron Keating, Yvette Fielding, Diane-Louise Jordan, Anthea Turner and Tim Vincent.

Wheel of Fortune
Leslie succeeded Bradley Walsh as the main presenter of the British version of Wheel of Fortune. He was succeeded in 2001 by Paul Hendy. That year, he turned up on Lily Savage's Blankety Blank.

This Morning
From series 11 in 1999 Leslie, alongside Fern Britton, was a regular presenter of the Friday edition. When Richard Madeley and Judy Finnigan departed the show in 2001, they were replaced by Coleen Nolan and Twiggy, with Britton and Leslie remaining on Fridays. However, Nolan and Twiggy proved less popular with viewers, so Britton and Leslie took on the full job of presenting the show, bringing the ratings back up to around one million. In 2002, after allegations of sexual offences were made in the press against Leslie, he was dismissed from the programme and replaced by Phillip Schofield from Mondays to Thursdays and by Eamonn Holmes on Fridays (with Ruth Langsford).

Music and radio
In December 2003, Leslie appeared in the music video for the Christmas single "Proper Crimbo", released by Bo' Selecta! creator Leigh Francis, alongside Matthew Wright in a spoof of their presumed rivalry.

In November 2012, John Leslie began to present Friday's Drivetime show on 98.8 Castle FM, hoping to revive his career as a radio DJ. In March 2013, Leslie was among the Castle FM presenters who walked out in a disagreement with their management, only to be locked out when they tried to return. By the end of the year, the radio station had become automated, with no presenters.

On 28 March 2014, it was announced that Leslie would begin presenting his own Saturday (10:00 to 14:00) radio show across the Scottish Bauer Radio AM network, debuting the following day.

Allegations
In October 2002, Ulrika Jonsson had written in her autobiography, Honest, that "an acquaintance" had raped her when she was 19. Amid media speculation, television presenter Matthew Wright mistakenly named Leslie as the alleged predator on The Wright Stuff. Jonsson has never said whether the correct person was named, and Leslie was never charged for offences against Jonsson. Wright has since apologised to Leslie and said he named him in error. Despite this, the story was widely covered in the tabloids.

Other women made accusations of indecent assault against Leslie, and he was arrested in December 2002 on one count of rape and two concerning indecent assault, being then released on bail after being interviewed by the police. He was charged in June 2003 with assaulting a woman twice between 25 and 28 May 1997. The prosecution dropped the charges against Leslie at Southwark Crown Court on 31 July 2003 after new information from the alleged victim. On the court steps after the end of the hearing, Leslie said that he had "been to hell and back" and that he had "maintained [his] innocence throughout".

In July 2018, Leslie was cleared of assaulting a woman at a nightclub in June 2017 after a two-day trial at Edinburgh Sheriff Court. Leslie announced that he was going to make a complaint against Police Scotland.

In June 2019, Leslie was charged with sexually assaulting a then 30-year-old woman in Westminster during December 2008. That August, Leslie pleaded not guilty at Southwark Crown Court and he was released on bail.  He was cleared of this charge by a jury on 19 October 2020. Judge Deborah Taylor subsequently told him: "You, for the second time, leave this court without a stain on your character and I hope it will be the last time you have to attend."

Filmography
 Formula One (1989)
 Blue Peter (1989–94)
 Future Cooks (1993)
 Scavengers (1994–95)
 This Morning (1999–2002)
 Style Challenge (1996–98)
 Survivor (2001)
 Was It Good for You? (1999)
 Wheel of Fortune (1998–2001)
 Mega Machines (narrator) (1995)

References

External links

1965 births
Blue Peter presenters
Living people
People acquitted of sex crimes
People educated at James Gillespie's High School
People educated at Liberton High School
Television personalities from Edinburgh
Scottish game show hosts
Scottish television presenters